Charlotte Elisabeth Henriette Holstein née zu Inn- und Knyphausen (3 February 1741 – 18 May 1809, Vallø) was a Danish noblewoman. She served as Overhofmesterinde to Denmark's queen consort Caroline Matilda of Great Britain in 1770-1772.

Life
By birth she was friherreinde (baroness) zu Inn- und Knyphausen.

On 20 May 1769, she married Christian Frederik Holstein, lensgrev (von) Holstein.

In 1770, she was appointed Mistress of the Robes to Denmark's queen consort Caroline Matilda of Great Britain in succession to Margrethe von der Lühe. She was a lady of the Ordre de l'Union Parfaite (1770).

After the death of her spouse in 1799, she became deaconess of Vallø stift, where she later died.

References

 Danmarks Adels Aarbog, Thiset, Hiort-Lorenzen, Bobé, Teisen., (Dansk Adelsforening), [1884 - 2011]., DAA 1988-90:753.

1741 births
1809 deaths
Danish countesses
Danish ladies-in-waiting
Ordre de l'Union Parfaite